Thomas Henry Filmore (March 14, 1906 – January 11, 1954) was a Canadian professional ice hockey player who played 116 games in the National Hockey League. Born in Thamesford, Ontario. He played for the Boston Bruins, Detroit Falcons, and New York Americans between 1930 and 1934. The rest of his career, which lasted from 1927 to 1942, was spent in various minor leagues.

Career statistics

Regular season and playoffs

External links

Obituary at LostHockey.com

1906 births
1954 deaths
Boston Bruins players
Boston Cubs players
Canadian ice hockey right wingers
Detroit Falcons players
Detroit Olympics (CPHL) players
Detroit Olympics (IHL) players
Fort Worth Rangers players
Ice hockey people from Ontario
London Panthers players
New York Americans players
Ontario Hockey Association Senior A League (1890–1979) players
People from Oxford County, Ontario
Providence Reds players
Quebec Castors players
Springfield Indians players
Canadian expatriate ice hockey players in the United States